"Golden Baby" is a song by Canadian singer Cœur de pirate, from her second studio album Blonde (2011). It was released as a single in France on February 24, 2012.

Track listing
Digital download
 "Golden Baby" – 3:07

Personnel
Credits adapted from Blonde album liner notes.

Howard Bilerman – producer, recording 
Pierrick Devin – mixing
François Gueurce – recording 
Béatrice Martin – vocals, producer
Marc Thériault – mastering

Charts

References

2011 songs
2012 singles
Cœur de pirate songs